Druval "Duvie" Westcott (born October 30, 1977) is a Canadian former professional ice hockey defenceman who last played for the Hamburg Freezers of the Deutsche Eishockey Liga (German Ice Hockey League). Westcott played his whole National Hockey League career with the Columbus Blue Jackets before signing with Dinamo Riga of the KHL.

Playing career
Westcott was signed by Columbus as an undrafted free agent on 10 May 2001. Westcott has played in 201 career NHL games, scoring eleven goals and 45 assists for 56 points. He had also compiled 299 penalty minutes.  During the NHL lockout, he played in Finland.
On July 22, 2008, Westcott signed a one-year contract with Dinamo Riga of the Kontinental Hockey League.

On May 21, 2009, Westcott signed a one-year contract with Dinamo Minsk of the Kontinental Hockey League. Westcott moved to the Swiss National League A for the following two seasons, playing with the ZSC Lions and Kloten Flyers.

On June 19, 2012, Westcott continued his journeyman career throughout Europe, and signed a two-year deal with German club, to add experience to the Blueline of the Hamburg Freezers of the DEL.

Career statistics

Awards and honours

References

External links
 

1977 births
Living people
Canadian ice hockey defencemen
Columbus Blue Jackets players
Dinamo Riga players
HC Dinamo Minsk players
Hamburg Freezers players
Ice hockey people from Winnipeg
JYP Jyväskylä players
EHC Kloten players
Omaha Lancers players
St. Cloud State Huskies men's ice hockey players
Syracuse Crunch players
Undrafted National Hockey League players
Winnipeg South Blues players
ZSC Lions players
Canadian expatriate ice hockey players in Belarus
Canadian expatriate ice hockey players in Latvia
Canadian expatriate ice hockey players in Finland
Canadian expatriate ice hockey players in Germany
Canadian expatriate ice hockey players in Switzerland